Alpha-D-ribose 1-methylphosphonate 5-triphosphate synthase is an enzyme with systematic name ATP:methylphosphonate 5-triphosphoribosyltransferase. This enzyme catalyses the following chemical reaction

 ATP + methylphosphonate  alpha-D-ribose 1-methylphosphonate 5-triphosphate + adenine

This enzyme is isolated from the bacterium Escherichia coli.

References

External links 
 

EC 2.7.8